The Jeker is a river in Belgium and in the Netherlands. It is a left-bank tributary to the river Meuse. The source of the Jeker is near the village of Geer, in the Belgian province of Liège.

Places through which the Jeker passes include Waremme, Tongeren, Kanne, (all three in Belgium) and Maastricht.

Recreational aspect

Rafting on the Jeker is an entertaining recreational activity. Beginning in Kanne, it is possible to raft into the city of Maastricht on this relaxing river. The water flow is best in mid-autumn and spring. Obstacles may be present when the water is low. The trip from Kanne to Maastricht takes about two hours and crosses the border between Belgium and the Netherlands.

Gallery

International rivers of Europe
Rivers of Belgium
Rivers of the Netherlands
Rivers of Liège Province
Rivers of Limburg (Belgium)
Rivers of South Limburg (Netherlands)
Geography of Maastricht
Tongeren